is a former Japanese football player.

Club statistics

References

External links

J. League

1985 births
Living people
Association football people from Tokushima Prefecture
Japanese footballers
J2 League players
Japan Football League players
Ehime FC players
Tokushima Vortis players
Kamatamare Sanuki players
Mitsubishi Mizushima FC players
MIO Biwako Shiga players
Association football defenders